Federico Alejandro Bongioanni (born November 6, 1978 in Córdoba) is an Argentine football midfielder who currently plays for General Paz Juniors in the Torneo Argentino B.

Bongioanni began his career at Instituto Córdoba in 2001. He also played in Argentina for Talleres de Córdoba later in his career. He went abroad to play in Chile for Huachipato, U. de Concepción and Deportes Concepción. In addition, he had a short spell in Ecuador with club Aucas. In 2008 Bongioanni signed with Bolivian club Aurora, helping the team win the Clausura tournament.

Honours
Aurora
 Bolivian Primera División (1): 2008

References

External links
 

1978 births
Living people
Sportspeople from Córdoba Province, Argentina
Argentine footballers
Association football midfielders
Instituto footballers
Talleres de Córdoba footballers
C.D. Huachipato footballers
Deportes Concepción (Chile) footballers
Universidad de Concepción footballers
Club Aurora players
Chilean Primera División players
Expatriate footballers in Chile
Expatriate footballers in Ecuador
Expatriate footballers in Bolivia
Expatriate footballers in Venezuela
Argentine expatriate footballers
Argentine expatriate sportspeople in Chile
Argentine expatriate sportspeople in Ecuador
Argentine expatriate sportspeople in Bolivia
Argentine expatriate sportspeople in Venezuela